The Senate Committee on Indian Affairs is a committee of the United States Senate charged with oversight in matters related to the American Indian, Native Hawaiian, and Alaska Native peoples. A Committee on Indian Affairs existed from 1820 to 1947, after which it was folded into the Committee on Interior and Insular Affairs. A new Native Affairs Committee was created in 1977, initially as a select committee, as a result of the detachment of indigenous affairs from the new Committee on Energy and National Resources, which had succeeded the old Committee on Interior and Insular Affairs.  The committee was initially intended to be temporary, but was made permanent in 1984. The committee tends to include senators from Western and Plains states, who have more Native American constituents.

History

Summary
In 1977, the Senate approved  which re-established the Committee on Indian Affairs as a temporary select committee. The Select Committee was to disband at the close of the 95th Congress, but following several interim extensions, the Senate voted to make the Committee permanent on June 6, 1984. The committee has jurisdiction to study the unique problems of American Indian, Native Hawaiian, and Alaska Native peoples and to propose legislation to alleviate these difficulties. These issues include, but are not limited to, Native education, economic development, land management, trust responsibilities, health care, and claims against the United States. Additionally, all legislation proposed by Members of the Senate that specifically pertains to American Indians, Native Hawaiians, or Alaska Natives is under the jurisdiction of the committee.

Early era
Until 1946, when the Legislative Reorganization Act abolished both the House and Senate Committees on Indian Affairs, the Senate Committee on Indian Affairs had been in existence since the early 19th century. After 1946, Native affairs legislative and oversight jurisdiction was vested in subcommittees of the Interior and Insular Affairs Committees of the House of Representatives and the Senate. While this subcommittee arrangement may not have specifically reflected a diminishment of the consideration given Native affairs by the Congress, the revised arrangement historically coincided with a 20-year hiatus in Native affairs known as the "Termination Era" – a period in which the prevailing policy of the United States was to terminate the Federal relationship with Native tribes or transfer jurisdiction over tribal lands to the states.

By the mid-1960s, this Termination philosophy was in decline as a failed policy and the Congress began to include Native tribes in legislation designed to rebuild the social infrastructure of the Nation and provide economic opportunities for economically depressed areas. In the early 1970s the Termination era was decisively ended with the enactment of the Menominee Restoration Act of 1973. Although a number of important legislative initiatives affecting Natives were enacted in the early 1970s, it became clear that the existing subcommittee structure was not providing an adequate forum for legislating appropriate solutions to problems confronting Native country. Legislative jurisdiction over Native affairs was fragmented among a number of committees. Overall, more than 10 committees in the Congress were responsible for Indian affairs, a situation which resulted in a sometimes disjointed treatment of Native affairs and in an often haphazard development of Federal Native policy.

Re-establishment of committee
In 1973, Senator James Abourezk introduced  to establish a Federal commission to review all aspects of policy, law, and administration relating to affairs of the United States with American Native tribes and people. The Senate and the House of Representatives both adopted S.J. Res. 133 and on January 2, 1975, the Resolution was signed into law by the President, thus establishing the American Indian Policy Review Commission. As the work of this Commission progressed, it became readily apparent that a full Senate committee with full legislative and oversight authority was needed to receive the report of the American Indian Policy Review Commission and to act upon its recommendations. Indeed, one of the final recommendations of the Commission was that a full-fledged Native Affairs Committee be established in the Senate.

At the same time the Commission was formulating its recommendation for the establishment of a Native Affairs Committee, the Senate was developing a far-reaching proposal for reorganization of the entire Senate committee system. Under this proposal, the Subcommittee on Indian Affairs under the Committee on Interior and Insular Affairs was to be abolished with its natural resource functions to be distributed among other newly formed Senate committees and its human resources functions to be transferred to the Senate Committee on Labor and Human Resources. In view of the pending report of the American Indian Policy Review Commission and its anticipated recommendations, however, the Senate revamped its committee reorganization proposal to include the establishment of a temporary select committee to receive the Commission's report and to act on its recommendations. Thus, there was included within  of February 4, 1977, the Committee System Reorganization Amendments of 1977, a provision to establish a Select Committee on Native Affairs with full jurisdiction over all proposed legislation and other matters relating to Native affairs. With the commencement of the 96th Congress, the Select Committee on Indian Affairs was to expire and jurisdiction over Native matters was to be transferred to the Senate Committee on Labor and Human Resources.

As the Select Committee on Indian Affairs grappled with the report of the American Indian Policy Review Commission and the many other Native issues that were presented to it during the 95th Congress, it became increasingly evident that if the Congress was to continue to meet its constitutional, legal, and historical responsibilities in the area of Native affairs, an ongoing legislative committee with adequate expertise and resources should be re-established in the Senate.

, to make the Select Committee on Indian Affairs a permanent committee of the Senate, was introduced by Senator Abourezk on February 22, 1978. The measure was amended by the Rules Committee to extend the life of the committee for two years until January 2, 1981, and was agreed to by the Senate on October 14, 1978. In the 96th Congress, Senator John Melcher, who was at the time chairman of the Select Committee, introduced  to make it a permanent committee. The Resolution had 28 cosponsors, and was reported by the Rules Committee with an amendment to extend the select committee to January 2, 1984, and to expand the membership to seven members commencing in the 97th Congress. S. Res. 448 was adopted by the Senate on December 11, 1980.

Permanent committee
On April 28, 1983, Senator Mark Andrews, Chairman of the Select Committee on Indian Affairs in the 98th Congress, introduced  to make the committee a permanent committee. This Resolution had 28 cosponsors. On November 1, 1983, the Committee on Rules and Administration voted unanimously to report the Resolution without amendment, and the Resolution was so reported on November 2, 1983 (S. Rept. 98–294). On November 18, the last day of the first session of the 98th Congress, the Senate agreed to an extension of the select committee to July 1, 1984, in order to allow time for later debate. By the time the Resolution was brought to the floor for consideration there were 60 cosponsors. On June 4, 1984, the Select Committee on Indian Affairs was made a permanent committee of the Senate. In 1993, the Select Committee on Indian Affairs was redesignated as the Committee on Indian Affairs.

Members, 118th Congress

Historical committee membership

117th Congress

116th Congress

115th Congress

Source

Chairmen

Chairmen of the Senate Committee on Indian Affairs, 1820–1947
David Holmes (R-MS) 1820–1821
Henry Johnson (R-LA) 1821–1823
Thomas Hart Benton (R/D-MO) 1823–1828
Hugh Lawson White (D-TN) 1828–1832
George M. Troup (D-GA) 1832–1833
Hugh Lawson White (W-TN) 1833–1840
Ambrose Sevier (D-AR) 1840–1841
James T. Morehead (W-KY) 1841–1842
Albert White (W-IN) 1842–1845
Ambrose Sevier (D-AR) 1845–1846
Arthur Bagby (D-AL) 1846–1847
David R. Atchison (D-MO) 1847–1853
William K. Sebastian (D-AR) 1853–1861
James Rood Doolittle (R-WI) 1861–1867
John B. Henderson (R-MO) 1867–1869
James Harlan (R-IA) 1869–1873
William Alfred Buckingham (R-CT) 1873–1875
William B. Allison (R-IA) 1875–1879
Richard Coke (D-TX) 1879–1881
Henry Dawes (R-MA) 1881–1893
James K. Jones (D-AR) 1893–1895
Richard Pettigrew (R-SD) 1895–1899
John M. Thurston (R-NE) 1899–1901
William Stewart (R-NV) 1901–1905
Moses E. Clapp (R-MN) 1905–1911
Robert J. Gamble (R-SD) 1911–1913
William J. Stone (D-MO) 1913–1914
Henry F. Ashurst (D-AZ) 1914–1919
Charles Curtis (R-KS) 1919–1921
Selden P. Spencer (R-MO) 1921–1923
John W. Harreld (R-OK) 1923–1927
Lynn J. Frazier (R-ND) 1927–1933
Burton K. Wheeler (D-MT) 1933–1936
Elmer Thomas (D-OK) 1936–1945
Joseph O'Mahoney (D-WY) 1945–1947

from 1947 to 1977, Indian Affairs were the responsibility of the Senate Committee on Interior and Insular Affairs, which was superseded by the U.S. Senate Committee on Energy and Natural Resources in 1977.

Chairmen of the Senate Select Committee on Indian Affairs, 1977–1993
James Abourezk (D-SD) 1977–1979
John Melcher (D-MT) 1979–1981
William S. Cohen (R-ME) 1981–1983
Mark Andrews (R-ND) 1983–1987
Daniel K. Inouye (D-HI) 1987–1993

Chairpersons of the Senate Committee on Indian Affairs, 1993–present
Daniel K. Inouye (D-HI) 1993–1995
John McCain (R-AZ) 1995–1997
Ben Nighthorse Campbell (R-CO) 1997–2001
Daniel K. Inouye (D-HI) 2001
Ben Nighthorse Campbell (R-CO) 2001
Daniel K. Inouye (D-HI) 2001–2003
Ben Nighthorse Campbell (R-CO) 2003–2005
John McCain (R-AZ) 2005–2007
Byron Dorgan (D-ND) 2007–2011
Daniel Akaka (D-HI) 2011–2013
Maria Cantwell (D-WA) 2013–2014
Jon Tester (D-MT) 2014–2015
John Barrasso (R-WY) 2015–2017
John Hoeven (R-ND) 2017–2021
Brian Schatz (D-HI) 2021–present

References

External links
 

Indian Affairs
Native American topics
1820 establishments in Washington, D.C.